A loophole is a protected small opening, which allows a firearm to be aimed and discharged, while providing cover and concealment for the rifleman.  To prevent detection, the rifle's muzzle should not protrude through the loophole, particularly at night to hide the muzzle flash.

Arrowslit

The precursor to the loophole for firearms was the arrowslit, which is a narrow aperture in a fortification for an archer to launch arrows or an arbalist to launch crossbow bolts.  The earliest use of the arrowslit was alleged to have been by Archimedes during the siege of Syracuse in 214–212 BC.  Arrowslits were used in ancient Greek warfare and by the military of ancient Rome.  There was a reintroduction of arrowslits during the medieval warfare period at Dover Castle and Framlingham Castle in England and by Richard the Lionheart at Château Gaillard in France.

First World War

During the First World War, the static movement of trench warfare and a need for protection from snipers created a requirement for loopholes both for discharging firearms and for observation.  Often a steel plate was used with a "key hole", which had a rotating piece to cover the loophole when not in use.

Major Hesketh Hesketh-Prichard of the Canadian Expeditionary Force and a trainer of snipers, wrote about the use of loopholes in his book, ''Sniping in France: Winning the Sniping War in the Trenches:
 

One counter-sniper tactic to overcome steel plate loopholes was to wait for a sniper to open the key hole and then fire a large calibre firearm, such as an elephant gun, to penetrate through the steel plate and eliminate the sniper.

See also
 Embrasure, a larger opening in a fortification, often for artillery
 Mouse-holing combat tactic
 Periscope rifle
 Technology during World War I

References

Sniper warfare tactics
Trench warfare